The Campo Almirante Reis, also known as Campo Dom Carlos I, is a former football ground, which was located in the city of Funchal, on the island of Madeira, Portugal. The ground was located right in the heart of Funchal's city centre, on the Rua Dom Carlos I in the Socorro area of town. The pitch was bordered on its south touchline by the Atlantic Ocean, and on its northern touchline by a small embankment and the tree-lined street, Rua Dom Carlos I.

It was the original home of C.S. Marítimo before the team relocated to their current home, the Estádio dos Barreiros in 1935, though to this day it still very much remains a spiritual home to the club. Though being deserted by Marítimo, the clubs' original headquarters building adjacent to the site, remained in use until 2005. The ground was the venue of Marítimo's famous 10–0 victory in the local derby against Nacional, which took place on December 12, 1925.

After its use as a football venue expired, the land was converted into a car park, and in 2003 the Funchal Cable Car station to Monte  and public park was built on the site, replacing the car park. Located just a few metres north of where the ground once stood, is the Campo do Adelino Rodrigues, another small football stadium which is still in use today.

See also
C.S. Marítimo
Estádio dos Barreiros

C.S. Marítimo
Defunct football venues in Portugal